Powburn is a small village on the A697 in Northumberland, England about  south of Wooler and  northwest of Alnwick.

Landmarks
The Devil's Causeway passes through the village and continues north under the A697 road crossing the River Till. The causeway is a Roman road which starts at Portgate on Hadrian's Wall, north of Corbridge, and extends  northwards across Northumberland to the mouth of the River Tweed at Berwick-upon-Tweed.

By the roadside a stiff half-mile eastwards from Powburn is Crawley Tower, a fine medieval Border pele. The fortification is a strong one (its defensive ditch is still imposing) and probably guarded the crossing, near the former Hedgeley railway station, of the Breamish by the Devil's Causeway.

References

External links

Villages in Northumberland